The 1979 NCAA Division II football rankings are from the Associated Press. This is for the 1979 season.

Legend

Associated Press poll

References

Rankings
 NCAA Division II football rankings